Moeyungyi Wetland Wildlife Sanctuary is a protected area in Myanmar's Bago Division, covering an area of . It was established in 1988 and gained the status of an Important Bird Area in 2003.

During a survey in the winter of 2014–2015, 52 bird species were recorded including black-headed ibis (Threskiornis melanocephalus), painted stork (Mycteria leucocephala), Oriental darter (Anhinga melanogaster), great egret (Ardea alba), cattle egret (Bubulcus ibis), intermediate egret (Mesophoyx intermedia), little egret (Egretta garzetta), Asian openbill (Anastomus oscitans), lesser whistling-duck (Dendrocygna javanica), pygmy goose (Nettapus coromandelianus), purple swamphen (Porphyrio porphyria), pheasant-tailed jacana (Hydrophasianus chirurgus), Northern pintail (Anas acuta), little cormorant (Phalacrocorax niger), little grebe (Tachybaptus ruficollis), osprey (Pandion haliaetus), pied harrier (Circus melanoleucos), eastern marsh harrier (Circus spilonotus) and black drongo (Dicrurus macrocercus).

References

External links

Protected areas of Myanmar
Protected areas established in 1988
Important Bird Areas of Myanmar
Ramsar sites in Myanmar